Alexander Cijan (born 16 May 1994) is an Austrian former professional ice hockey forward who played in the ICE Hockey League (ICEHL).

Playing career
Cijan returned to his native Austrian, joining EC Red Bull Salzburg after making his professional debut with Swedish club, Mora IK of the HockeyAllsvenskan, on 16 April 2014.

After six seasons within EC Red Bull Salzburg, Cijan left as a free agent following the 2018–19 season. He signed a one-year contract with fellow EBEL club, EHC Black Wings Linz on 19 April 2019.

International play
He participated with  Austrian national team at the 2015 IIHF World Championships.

References

External links

1994 births
Living people
Austrian ice hockey forwards
EHC Black Wings Linz players
Sportspeople from Klagenfurt
Mora IK players
EC Red Bull Salzburg players
Vienna Capitals players